Inzone is a brand of Sony Electronics used for gaming-focused television and headphones products. It was announced on June 28, 2022 with a lineup of two computer monitors and three headphones intended for PC gaming. The brand name is intended to reflect the concept of being "in the zone".

Product range

Monitors 
As of June 2022 there are two Inzone monitors, both of which diagonally measure 27 inches [CONVERT] large. The M3 is the low-end model, which Sony priced as US$529. The M9 is the high-end model, priced at $899.

Headphones 
As of June 2022, Sony offers three Inzone headphone models: the $100 H3, the $229 H7, and the $300 H9.

References 

Sony products
Video game hardware
2022 introductions
2022 in video gaming